The 1970 Trans-AMA motocross series was an international series established by the American Motorcyclist Association as a pilot event to help establish motocross in the United States. The motocross series was an invitational based on a combined 250 and 500cc engine displacement formula, run on American tracks featuring the top riders from the F.I.M. world championship against the top American riders.

BSA factory rider Dave Nicoll claimed the championship without winning a single event, due to his consistent results. The Suzuki team of Joel Robert and Olle Petterson didn't join the event until the third race of the series. Robert went on to dominate, but his late start hurt his chances to claim the overall championship. As a result of his being the highest placed American rider at fourth overall, Dick Burleson, was crowned the first-ever American motocross national champion.

1970 Trans-AMA final standings

1970 Trans-AMA Round 1 
LaRue, Ohio (250cc)

1970 Trans-AMA Round 2 
Unadilla, New York (250cc)

1970 Trans-AMA Round 3 
Delta, Ohio (500cc)

1970 Trans-AMA Round 4 
Franklin, Georgia (500cc)

1970 Trans-AMA Round 5 
Lewisville, Texas (250cc)

1970 Trans-AMA Round 6 
Irvine, California (500cc)

1970 Trans-AMA Round 7 
Carlsbad, California (250cc)

1970 Trans-AMA Round 8 
Puyallup, Washington (500cc)

References

External links
 American Motorcyclist, December 1970
 American Motorcyclist, January 1971

Trans-AMA
Trans-AMA
Trans-AMA motocross series
AMA Motocross Championship Season
Trans-AMA